Bruno Contrada (born September 2, 1931 in Naples, Italy) is the former police chief of Palermo and deputy director of the civil intelligence service SISDE who was arrested based on revelations of former Sicilian Mafiosi turned pentiti, Gaspare Mutolo and Giuseppe Marchese.

Biography
Contrada was born in Naples. He entered the Italian police in 1958, and in 1973 he received the command of the judiciary police in Palermo.

In 1982 he moved to SISDE with the responsibility of the offices in Sicily and Sardinia. In 1986 he was called to Rome  in the Operational Division of the SISDE directory. In 1992, together with Italian Police head Arturo Parisi, he had a secret meeting with antimafia judge Paolo Borsellino under the direction of the then Minister of Interiors, Nicola Mancino. Borsellino, who was reportedly shattered by the meeting, was assassinated two days later in Palermo. Contrada later declared to have been a friend of Borsellino, but the latter's family sharply denied this. Other leading antimafia judge, Giovanni Falcone (also killed two months before Borsellino) had also declared that he did not trust Contrada.

On 24 December 1992, Contrada was arrested. He was accused of having informed the Mafia of upcoming police operations, and preventing an early capture of the Corleonesi boss and fugitive Totò Riina.

Contrada had initially come under suspicion when the first pentito, Tommaso Buscetta warned the anti-Mafia prosecutor, Giovanni Falcone that in 1984, Contrada was suspected of protecting certain bosses, tipping them off about possible police raids. Falcone had also suspected Contrada of informing the Mafia of his intention to invite visiting Swiss prosecutors to his summer house in Addaura on the afternoon of June 19, 1989, when an attempt was made on his life. During the investigations into the money laundering networks of the Mafia in Switzerland it became clear that Contrada had warned a suspect about his impending arrest so that he could escape in time.

The first trial against him began on April 12, 1994, lasted for twenty-two hearings and ended on April 5, 1996, the courts sentenced him to ten years imprisonment for collusion with the Mafia. On May 4, 2001, the Court of Appeal acquitted him, but on December 12, 2002, the Court of Cassation annulled that judgement on appeal, ordering a new trial before a different section of the Court of Appeal of Palermo. On February 26, 2006, the appellate court confirmed, after 31 hours of deliberations, the verdict of the first trial and sentenced Contrada to ten years in prison and payment of court costs.  On May 10, 2007, the Court of Cassation confirmed the conviction on appeal.

In 2015, the European Court of Human Rights ruled that Contrada was convicted for acts that at that time were not a crime, in violation of the principle of non-retroactivity of criminal law (nulla poena sine lege). In 2017, 25 years after his arrest, the Supreme Court of Cassation definitively annulled the guilty verdict.

References

Sources
Stille, Alexander (1995). Excellent Cadavers. The Mafia and the Death of the First Italian Republic, New York: Vintage

External links
Official website   
 Intervista a Bruno Contrada - video libero.it 

Living people
1931 births
Italian police officers
Law enforcement in Italy
Overturned convictions in Italy
People from Naples